Sasken Technologies Limited (formerly Sasken Communication Technologies Limited) is an Indian multinational technology company, based in Bangalore, India, which provides product engineering and digital transformation services to global customers in industries such as semiconductors, automotive, consumer electronics, enterprise grade devices, Smart devices and wearables, industrials, and telecommunication.

Origin 
Sasken began as the brainchild of Rajiv C Mody, its Chairman & MD, and three other co-founders: Krishna Jhaveri, Suresh Dholakia, and Badruddin Agarwala. Sasken came into being as Silicon Automation Systems (SAS) in 1989 in a small warehouse in Fremont, California. Later, the company changed its name to Sasken Communication Technologies Limited. The name 'Sasken' is an portmanteau of its original name (SAS) and 'ken', the Scottish word for knowledge.

In February 2017, Sasken announced that it had changed its name to Sasken Technologies Limited to serve customers in businesses ranging from automotive, enterprise grade devices, smart devices and wearables, industrials, and satellite communication. In January 2018, Sasken unveiled a new logo to reflect its 30-year-old heritage.

Sasken employs 2000+ people, operating from development centers in Bengaluru, Pune, Chennai, Kolkata and Hyderabad (India), Kaustinen and Tampere (Finland), Detroit (USA), and Beijing and Shanghai (China). Sasken also has a presence across Germany, Japan, UK, and USA.

In July 2022, Sasken announced that Abhijit Kabra was appointed as the CEO.

Subsidiaries 

Sasken Network Engineering Limited (SNEL), a wholly owned subsidiary of Sasken, was created when the company acquired the operations of Blue Broadband Technologies.
Sasken acquired iSoftTech Private Limited, Chennai in June 2006.
In September 2006, Sasken also acquired a Finnish company named Botnia Hightech Oy. It is now known as Sasken Finland Oy.
On 24 January 07 Sasken has entered into a joint venture with Tata Autocomp. The JV will be known as TACO Sasken Automotive Electronics Pvt Ltd (TSAE).

References 

Software companies of India
Companies based in Bangalore
Indian companies established in 1989
Software companies established in 1989
1989 establishments in Karnataka
Companies listed on the National Stock Exchange of India
Companies listed on the Bombay Stock Exchange